The 1888 Virginia Orange and Blue football team represented the University of Virginia as an independent during the 1888 college football season.

Schedule

References

Virginia
Virginia Cavaliers football seasons
Virginia Orange and Blue football